Ben Harrison may refer to:

Ben Harrison (Australian footballer) (born 1975), Carlton, Richmond and Western Bulldogs player
Ben Harrison (footballer, born 1997), English footballer
Ben Harrison (rugby league) (born 1988), Warrington Wolves player and Ireland international
Ben Harrison (sound designer), sound designer specialising in musical theatre and live events
 Ben Harrison, co-developer of the video game Angband
 Ben Harrison, character on Naturally, Sadie

See also
Benjamin Harrison (disambiguation)